Putri Kusuma Wardani (born 20 July 2002) is an Indonesian badminton player affiliated with Exist Jakarta club.

Career 
Trained in Exist Jakarta club, Wardani entered the Indonesia national training center in 2018. In the national tournament, she was part of the Exist team that won the 2018 Superliga Junior. She was selected to join National team squad to compete at the 2018 Asian and World Junior Championships, by securing the bronze medal in both tournaments. At the age of 16, she reached the final of a senior tournament Bangladesh International Challenge but proved second best to Vietnamese player Nguyễn Thùy Linh.

In 2019, Wardani finished as finalist at the Junior Grand Prix tournament Jaya Raya Junior International. She achieved the first title of her career when she won the Jakarta Junior International Series beating her compatriot Maharani Sekar Batari. In the team event, she helped the National team finish as runner-up in Asian Junior and win the Suhandinata Cup for the first time ever by defeating China in the mixed team final of World Junior Championships.

In 2021, Wardani claimed her first Super 300 event title at the Spain Masters defeated Line Christophersen of Denmark in the final at the age of 18. She then won the Czech Open and Bangladesh International.

In 2022, Wardani was featured in the Indonesian women's winning team at the Asia Team Championships. Wardani claimed her second World Tour title at the Orléans Masters by defeating Iris Wang in the final in a close rubber games. In May, she competed at the Southeast Asian Games, and won a silver medal in the women's team and a bronze in the singles.

2023 
Wardani started the BWF tour in the home tournament, Indonesia Masters, but lost in the second round from Korean player 3rd seed An Se-young. In the next tournament, she lost in the first round of the Thailand Masters from American player Beiwen Zhang in straight sets.

In February, Wardani join the Indonesia national badminton team to compete at the Badminton Asia Mixed Team Championships, but unfortunately the teams lost in the quarter-finals from team Korea.

Achievements

Southeast Asian Games 
Women's singles

BWF World Tour (2 titles)
The BWF World Tour, which was announced on 19 March 2017 and implemented in 2018, is a series of elite badminton tournaments sanctioned by the Badminton World Federation (BWF). The BWF World Tour is divided into levels of World Tour Finals, Super 1000, Super 750, Super 500, Super 300 (part of the HSBC World Tour), and the BWF Tour Super 100.

Women's singles

BWF International Challenge/Series (2 titles, 1 runner-up) 

Women's singles

  BWF International Challenge tournament
  BWF International Series tournament
  BWF Future Series tournament

BWF Junior International (1 title, 1 runner-up) 
Girls' singles

  BWF Junior International Grand Prix tournament
  BWF Junior International Challenge tournament
  BWF Junior International Series tournament
  BWF Junior Future Series tournament

Performance timeline

National team 
 Junior level

 Senior level

Individual competitions 
 Junior level

 Senior level

References

External links 

2002 births
Living people
People from Tangerang
Sportspeople from Banten
Indonesian female badminton players
Competitors at the 2021 Southeast Asian Games
Southeast Asian Games silver medalists for Indonesia
Southeast Asian Games medalists in badminton
21st-century Indonesian women